Zimbabwe participated in the 2010 Summer Youth Olympics in Singapore.

It was represented by 27 athletes competing in 5 sports: athletics, cycling, equestrian, football and triathlon.

Medalists

Athletics

Boys
Track and Road Events

Girls
Track and Road Events

Cycling

Cross Country

Time Trial

BMX

Road Race

Overall

Equestrian

Football

Men

Group D

 Qualified for semifinals

Results

5th place contest

Triathlon

Men's

Girls

Mixed

References

External links
Competitors List: Zimbabwe

2010 in Zimbabwean sport
Nations at the 2010 Summer Youth Olympics
Zimbabwe at the Youth Olympics